National Secondary Route 247, or just Route 247 (or ) is a National Road Route of Costa Rica, located in the Limón province.

Description
In Limón province the route covers Pococí canton (Guápiles, La Rita, Roxana, Cariari, Colorado, La Colonia districts).

References

Highways in Costa Rica